Rachid Khimoune is a French sculptor of Algerian descent born on April 7, 1953 in Decazeville, Aveyron.

Biography 

His father came in France in 1946 from El Ksar in Kabylie, Algeria. Between 1970 and 1974, Rachid Khimoune studied at the École nationale supérieure des Beaux-Arts in Paris. Painter at first, he became sculptor in the late 70s and early 80s. Since 1991, he lives with the journalist Ève Ruggiéri.

Work

Exhibitions 

 1975 : Galerie Sanguine, Collioure
 1977 : Georgetown University, Washington
 1980 : Galerie Peinture Fraîche, Paris
 1985 : Centre Culturel, Le Blanc Mesnil; Centre Culturel, Tulle; Centre d’action culturelle, Saint-Quentin-en-Yvelines
 1986 : Les hommes-valises, Centre culturel algérien, Paris; Centre Jean Gagnant, Limoges; École des Beaux-Arts, Nancy.
 1988 : Centre culturel, Neuchâtel (Suisse)
 1989 : Galerie du Théâtre de l’Agora, Évry; Centre Jacques Prévert, Évry; Poissons-marelles, Galerie Art’O, Aubervilliers (poem of Tahar Djaout); Galerie Antoine de Galbert, Grenoble
 1990 : Galerie Claudine Planque, Lausanne
 1991 : Galerie Claude Monet, Bezons (poem of Bernard Rousseaux); Futur-composé, Collégiale Saint-André, Chartres et Galerie Daphné Behm Williamme, Chartres; Galerie Régine Deschênes, Paris; Château de Servière, Marseille
 1992 : Ajuntament de Sabadell, Barcelone
 1993 : Musée Picasso, Antibes; Galerie Anpire, Paris
 1996 : Espace Pierre Cardin, Paris
 1998 : Galerie de l’Europe, Paris.
 2002 : Casa de Francia, Mexico
 2003 : Grimaldi Forum, Monte Carlo (Monaco)
 2006 : Galerie Samagra, Paris; Pavillon des Arts, Foire de Genève
 2007 : Ancien Hôtel de Ville de Saint-Denis-de-La-Réunion
 2007 : Bastide de Capelongue, Bonnieux
 2007 : Galerie Meyer Le Bihan, Paris.
 2008 : Maison Elsa Triolet - Aragon, Saint-Arnoult-en-Yvelines
 2009 : Art Sawa Galerie, Dubai. United Arab Emirates
 2010 : Maison de l'Afrique, Paris

Main sculptures 

 1985 : Relief, Espace Bonnefoix, Toulouse. Relief, Centre Culturel, Tulle. Les Enfants du Monde (The Children of the world), sculptures, Le Blanc-Mesnil.
 1986 : Relief, Besançon. Relief, Fondation Danielle Mitterrand, New York. Don Quichotte and Sancho Pança, sculpture, Stains. Relief, Bureau de Poste, Limoges-Beaubreuil.
 1987 : Relief, Pau. La Famille, relief, Hangzhou (China).
 1988 : Les Guerriers, sculpture, Olympic Park, Seoul (Korea).
 1989 : Les Quatre Mousquetaires, relief, Centre Jacques Prévert, Évry. Relief, Grenoble. Relief, Centre Culturel de La Madeleine, Évreux. Cheikh-speare, sculpture, Mantes-la-Jolie.
 1993 : Les Enfants du Monde, Sculptures, Neuchâtel. Les Croisés, Chartres.
 2001 : Les Enfants du Monde, 21 bronze sculptures installed on the terraces of the Parc de Bercy in Paris.
 2003 : Sculpture Felipe le Mexicain, Musée d’histoire, Cuernavaca (Mexico).
 2004 : Sculpture Jean-Baptiste le Monégasque, Monte-Carlo (Monaco).
 2007 : Sculpture Naomi l'Africaine, Ouagadougou (Burkina Faso).
 2007 : Relief Les Quatre Saisons, Villetaneuse.
 2009 : El Mamoun le Marocain, Sculpture and drawing, Hôtel La Mamounia, Marrakech (Maroc).
 2009 : Les Enfants du Monde, 21 bronze sculptures, American University, Abu Dhabi (UAE).
 2010 : Les Enfants du Monde, 21 bronze sculptures, Expo 2010 à Shanghai (Chine).
 2011 : 1000 Tortues-Casques, Parvis du Trocadéro, Paris (France).
 2011 : 1000 Tortues-Casques, Normandy’s Omaha Beach for the 67th anniversary of D-Day landings.

Bibliography 
 Rachid K., Futur-composé, texts by Georges Lemoine, Daphné Behm-Williamme, François Maspéro, Bernard Rousseaux, collégiale St André and Galerie Daphné Behm Williamme, 1991.
 Rachid Khimoune, by Pierre Restany, Michel Archimbaud, François Maspéro, Musée Picasso, Antibes, 1993.
 Les effets du voyage, 25 artistes algériens, (by Fatma Zohra Zamoum, Ramon Tio Bellido, Michel-Georges Bernard and Malika Dorbani Bouabdellah), Palais des Congrès et de la Culture, Le Mans, December 1995.
 Les Enfants du monde, by Rachid Khimoune, texts by François Maspero, Pierre Restany, Tahar Djaout, Jean-Marie Gibbal and an interview with Michel Archimbaud. Pictures by Philippe Fuzeau; Paris-Musées, Somogy éditions d'art, 2001.

See also 
 Sculpture

References

External links 
 official website of Rachid Khimoune
 Blog dedicated to the sculptures Les Enfants du monde in Paris

1953 births
Algerian sculptors
French sculptors
French male sculptors
Living people
Algerian artists
Algerian contemporary artists
21st-century Algerian people